Bruno Fontes da Mota (born 24 October 1987) is a Swiss football (soccer) midfielder, he plays for Swiss Challenge League team FC Le Mont.

Career 
He played youth football in Servette FC (2000–05) and Athlétique Régina (1993–2000), professional for AC Bellinzona (2007), FC Chiasso (2008) and Taranto Sport (2008–2009).

In January 2009, he was signed by FC Chiasso.

References

External links
Profile at Swiss Super League
Eurosport Profile
Soccerway Profile

Swiss men's footballers
Switzerland youth international footballers
Switzerland under-21 international footballers
Swiss expatriate footballers
Swiss expatriate sportspeople in Italy
Servette FC players
FC Chiasso players
U.C. Sampdoria players
AC Bellinzona players
Taranto F.C. 1927 players
Serie A players
Expatriate footballers in Italy
Swiss people of Portuguese descent
Association football midfielders
1987 births
Living people
Footballers from Geneva